Valerio Seta, O.S.M. (1562–1625) was a Roman Catholic prelate who served as Bishop of Alife (1608–1625).

Biography
Valerio Seta was born in Verona, Italy in 1562 and ordained a priest in the Order of Friar Servants of Mary.
On 24 Nov 1608, he was appointed during the papacy of Pope Paul V as Bishop of Alife.
On 7 Dec 1608, he was consecrated bishop by Bonifazio Bevilacqua Aldobrandini, Bishop of Cervia. 
He served as Bishop of Alife until his death in 1625.

While bishop, he was the principal co-consecrator of Ferdinand Boschetti, Titular Archbishop of Diocaesarea in Palaestina (1622).

References

External links and additional sources
 (for Chronology of Bishops) 
 (for Chronology of Bishops) 

17th-century French Roman Catholic bishops
Bishops appointed by Pope Paul V
Religious leaders from Verona
1562 births
1625 deaths
Servite bishops
Servites